Independent University, Bangladesh or IUB  is a private university in Bangladesh. It is located in Bashundhara Residential Area of Dhaka, Bangladesh. It was established in 1993 under the Private University Act, 1992. IUB has an enrollment of 10,000 students, 11,556 alumni, and 401 faculty members (of which 70% have Ph.D. mostly from North America). The campus is spread over three and a half acres and is well-equipped with an amphitheater, a library, state-of-the-art laboratories, and more than 120 classrooms. The university is committed to research and global partnerships. This is why students are encouraged to engage in research projects, alongside conventional classroom-based learning. The Independent University has academic research collaborations with a number of prestigious universities including Harvard University, Stanford University, and the University of Colorado at Boulder.

IUB is the only university in Bangladesh that was shortlisted in the Times Higher Education (THE) Awards 2020 for student recruitment campaign of the year. IUB's position is at the top in the whole of Asia. According to the world university rankings of Times Higher Education (THE), IUB stands within 400th universities globally in terms of various aspects of impact analysis.[] The Ranking Web of Universities (RWU) credited IUB as the top institution in the country in 2019. IUB, ranked 1st in Bangladesh, was also ranked 859th among the 11,852 Asian universities (excluding the Middle East), 124th among the 4,479 universities in South Asia, and 3,006th among the 28,000+ universities in the world. For comparison, the lowest-ranking institution in Bangladesh (i.e., 147th), was ranked 10,701st in Asia, 4,155th in South Asia, and 26,428th in the world, which clearly shows a wide spectrum of the quality of higher education in the country.

As the leading host institution for Fulbright Scholars in Bangladesh, the university offers exchange programs with scholars from top American and Canadian universities. The academic curriculum at the Independent University is based on a North American liberal arts model, and courses are taught in English. There are five academic schools at the university: School of Business and Entrepreneurship (SBE); School of Engineering, Technology, and Science (SETS); School of Environment and Life Sciences (SELS); School of Liberal Arts and Social Sciences (SLASS); and School of Pharmacy and Public Health (SPPH).

There are a lot of opportunities outside of the classroom for students to get involved. The Division of Student Affairs is responsible for organizing all student activities including the 17 university clubs. These include the art club, debating club, economics club, and film club. Students also participate in community service programs such as blood donation, fundraising for victims of natural disasters, and donating warm clothes in winter.

List of vice-chancellors 
 M Omar Ejaz Rahman (2012 – 2022)
 Tanweer Hasan (23 February 2022 – present)

Academics

School of Business and Entrepreneurship (SBE)

Undergraduate program
The school offers an undergraduate Bachelor of Business Administration (BBA) degree. Available areas of concentration are accounting, economics, finance, general management, human resource management, international business, management information systems, and marketing.

Graduate program (MBA)
The school offers an MBA degree. Students are allowed up to five years from the date of initial enrollment to complete the degree requirements. It is possible to finish the program within five semesters by taking the maximum course load, or within three semesters if students have waivers or transfer courses. Available areas of concentration are banking, finance, human resources management, and marketing.

Graduate program (EMBA)
The school also offers an EMBA degree.

Graduate program (MSc Economics)
The school also offers a Master of Science (MSc) in Economics degree. 
The program offers a concentration in Development Economics, International Economics, Applied Econometrics, Financial Economics and Environmental and Natural Resource Economics.

School of Engineering, Technology, and Sciences (SETS)

Undergraduate program

 B.Sc. in Electrical & Electronic Engineering (EEE)
 B.Sc. in Electrical & Telecommunication Engineering (ETE)
 B.Sc. in Computer Science & Engineering (CSE)
 B.Sc. in Computer Science (CSC)
 B.Sc. in Computer Engineering (CEN)
 B.Sc. in Physics
 B.Sc. in Mathematics

Graduate program

 M.Sc. in Computer Networks and Communications (CNC)
 M.Sc. in Telecommunication Engineering (TE)
 M.Sc. / M.Eng. in Electrical & Electronic Engineering (EEE)
 M.Sc. in Computer Science (CSC)
 M.Sc. in Software Engineering (SEN)

School of Environment and Life Sciences (SELS)

Undergraduate program
The school offers undergraduate programs on various majors under the Department of Environmental Science and Management and the Department of Life Sciences.

Graduate program
The school offers graduate programs on various majors.

School of Liberal Arts and Social Sciences (SLASS)

Undergraduate program
The school offers undergraduate programs on a rare variety including Anthropology, Sociology, Global Studies and Governance (the only program of such kind in the country), Media and Communication, English Literature, English Language Teaching and Law. Besides the school offers undergraduate minors on all subjects mentioned above. It also offers many foundation courses ranging from history to philosophy, art to politics, music to culture.

Graduate program
The school offers graduate programs in Development Studies, English Language Teaching, Media and Communication, and English Literature.

School of Pharmacy and Public Health (SPPH)

Undergraduate program
The school offers an undergraduate program in Pharmacy.

Executive Master of Public Health
The school offers an executive master of Public Health.

Faculty
The faculty includes scholars such as musicologist Mustafa Zaman Abbasi, microbiologist Shah M. Faruque, pharmacologist J. M. A. Hannan, and climatologist Saleemul Huq. Ekushey Padak and Independence Day Award recipient Enamul Haque taught at the university.

References
The content of this article is based on its Bangla equivalent on bangla Wikipedia.

External links

 

Educational institutions established in 1993
Private universities in Bangladesh
1993 establishments in Bangladesh
Universities and colleges in Dhaka